Wagner Santos de Souza Dias (born 23 July 1973), known as Waguinho Dias or simply Waguinho, is a Brazilian football coach and former player who played as a midfielder. He is the current head coach of Ipatinga.

Career
Born in Sumaré, São Paulo, Waguinho was a Ponte Preta youth graduate, playing for three years in the first team squad before moving out on loan to several sides. In 1987, he was sold to Mogi Mirim, and retired at the age of 30 in 1993 with Rio Branco-SP.

After retiring, Waguinho started working as a coach, his first being the under-20 side of União Barbarense in 1999. After being in charge of the under-20 teams of Guarani and Rio Branco, he was named manager of the latter's first team for the 2003 campaign.

Waguinho was an assistant of Rio Branco in 2004, and later returned to Guarani as a technical coordinator. In April 2006, he was named manager of the main squad in the place of Toninho Cerezo, but was sacked on 8 June after the club's president changed.

On 1 October 2006, after a brief period at Atlético Sorocaba, Waguinho returned to Bugre after Luiz Carlos Barbieri was sacked, but was unable to avoid relegation from the Série B. He was again dismissed the following 25 February, and worked for a brief period at Sumaré before taking over Santa Rita on 20 November 2007.

In February 2008, Waguinho returned to his native state after being appointed manager of Rio Branco-SP. In that season, he was also in charge of Portuguesa Santista, Operário-MS and Sendas.

In 2010, Waguinho returned to Guarani, again as a technical coordinator, and worked as an interim manager once. He returned to coaching duties on 19 September 2013, after being named at the helm of Galícia.

In 2014, Waguinho took over União Barbarense, and managed to save the club from relegation in the Campeonato Paulista Série A2. On 7 October of that year, he was appointed Velo Clube manager for the ensuing campaign, but returned to Barbarense the following 19 February.

On 16 November 2015, Waguinho was appointed in charge of Inter de Lages for the 2016 season. He avoided relegation from the Campeonato Catarinense with the side, and was named manager of Atlético Tubarão on 13 February 2017.

Waguinho led Tubarão to the 2017 Copa Santa Catarina title, and was named in charge of Marcílio Dias on 10 July 2018. Ahead of the 2019 Campeonato Brasileiro Série D, he was presented as manager of Brusque, and led the club to a first-ever title and promotion.

On 27 August 2019, Waguinho left Brusque and took over Criciúma in the second division. He was dismissed on 26 September after only five matches (two draws and three defeats), and was named in charge of América de Natal on 2 October.

On 3 February 2020, despite having six wins in nine matches, Waguinho was relieved of his duties at América. In the campaign, he also worked at Penapolense (where he left after suffering relegation in the Paulista A2) and Marcílio Dias.

Waguinho left Marcílio on 3 February 2021, after failing to agree new terms, and took over Uberlândia on 17 March. Sacked on 18 June, he returned to Brusque on 12 September, in the place of longtime incumbent Jerson Testoni.

Waguinho won the 2022 Campeonato Catarinense, but was sacked on 15 May 2022, after a poor start in the league.

Honours

Manager
Atlético Tubarão
Copa Santa Catarina: 2017

Brusque
Campeonato Brasileiro Série D: 2019
Campeonato Catarinense: 2022

References

External links

1963 births
Living people
Footballers from São Paulo (state)
Brazilian footballers
Association football midfielders
Brazilian football managers
Associação Atlética Ponte Preta players
Rio Branco Esporte Clube players
Esporte Clube XV de Novembro (Piracicaba) players
Mogi Mirim Esporte Clube players
Hercílio Luz Futebol Clube players
Clube Atlético Bragantino players
Campeonato Brasileiro Série B managers
Campeonato Brasileiro Série C managers
Campeonato Brasileiro Série D managers
Rio Branco Esporte Clube managers
Guarani FC managers
Clube Atlético Sorocaba managers
Associação Atlética Portuguesa (Santos) managers
Audax Rio de Janeiro Esporte Clube managers
Galícia Esporte Clube managers
União Agrícola Barbarense Futebol Clube managers
Associação Esportiva Velo Clube Rioclarense managers
Esporte Clube Internacional de Lages managers
Clube Náutico Marcílio Dias managers
Brusque Futebol Clube managers
Criciúma Esporte Clube managers
América Futebol Clube (RN) managers
Clube Atlético Penapolense managers
Uberlândia Esporte Clube managers
Ipatinga Futebol Clube managers